Chacha Tower is a clock tower located in Batumi, Georgia. It was built in 2012 by the city council with a cost of one million Georgian laris. It is a replica of the Clock Tower in İzmir, Turkey. Georgian chacha comes out of the fountains of the tower instead of water. The tower hosts a tourism information center.

As of 2015, the chacha fountain was reportedly nonfunctioning.

References

Buildings and structures in Batumi
Towers in Georgia (country)
Clock towers
Towers completed in 2012